This is a list of the bird species recorded in Northern Ireland. The avifauna of Northern Ireland include a total of 371 species, of which 10 have been introduced by humans.

This list's taxonomic treatment (designation and sequence of orders, families and species) and nomenclature (English and scientific names) are those of the International Ornithological Congress (IOC) as of July 2021.

The following tags have been used to highlight several categories. The commonly occurring native species do not fall into any of these categories.

 (A) Accidental - a species that rarely or accidentally occurs in Northern Ireland
 (I) Introduced - a species introduced to Northern Ireland as a consequence, direct or indirect, of human actions

Ducks, geese, and swans
Order: AnseriformesFamily: Anatidae

Anatidae includes the ducks and most duck-like waterfowl, such as geese and swans. These birds are adapted to an aquatic existence with webbed feet, flattened bills, and feathers that are excellent at shedding water due to an oily coating.

 Brant goose, Branta bernicla 
 Canada goose, Branta canadensis I
 Barnacle goose, Branta leucopsis 
 Cackling goose, Branta hutchinsii A
 Snow goose, Anser caerulescens A
 Greylag goose, Anser anser
 Taiga bean goose, Anser fabalis A
 Pink-footed goose, Anser brachyrhynchus
 Tundra bean goose, Anser serrirostris A
 Greater white-fronted goose, Anser albifrons
 Mute swan, Cygnus olor I
 Tundra swan, Cygnus columbianus
 Whooper swan, Cygnus cygnus  
 Egyptian goose, Aloochen aegyptiaca I
 Common shelduck, Tadorna tadorna 
 Ruddy shelduck, Tadorna ferruginea A
 Mandarin duck, Aix galericulata I' 
 Baikal teal, Sibirionetta formosa A
 Garganey, Spatula querquedula 
 Blue-winged teal, Spatula discors A
 Northern shoveler, Spatula clypeata 
 Gadwall, Mareca strepera
 Eurasian wigeon, Mareca penelope 
 American wigeon, Mareca americana A
 Mallard, Anas platyrhynchos 
 American black duck, Anas rubripes A
 Northern pintail, Anas acuta
 Eurasian teal, Anas crecca 
 Green-winged teal, Anas carolinensis 
 Red-crested pochard, Netta rufina 
 Common pochard, Aythya ferina  
 Ferruginous duck, Aythya nyroca A
 Ring-necked duck, Aythya collaris A
 Tufted duck, Aythya fuligula 
 Greater scaup, Aythya marila 
 Lesser scaup, Aythya affinis A
 King eider, Somateria spectabilis A
 Common eider, Somateria mollissima 
 Surf scoter, Melanitta perspicillata A
 Velvet scoter, Melanitta fusca 
 Common scoter, Melanitta nigra 
 Long-tailed duck, Clangula hyemalis 
 Bufflehead, Bucephala albeola A
 Common goldeneye, Bucephala clangula
 Barrow's goldeneye, Bucephala islandica A 
 Smew, Mergellus albellus
 Hooded merganser, Lophodytes cucullatus A 
 Common merganser, Mergus merganser 
 Red-breasted merganser, Mergus serrator 
 Ruddy duck, Oxyura jamaicensis I

Pheasants, grouse, and allies
Order: GalliformesFamily: Phasianidae

These are terrestrial species of gamebirds, feeding and nesting on the ground. They are variable in size but generally plump, with broad and relatively short wings.

 Willow ptarmigan, Lagopus lagopus A
 Western capercaillie, Tetrao urogallus I
 Grey partridge, Perdix perdix I
 Common pheasant, Phasianus colchicus I
 Common quail, Coturnix coturnix 
 Red-legged partridge, Alectorix rufa I

Nightjars and allies
Order: CaprimulgiformesFamily: Caprimulgidae

Nightjars are medium-sized nocturnal birds that usually nest on the ground. They have long wings, short legs and very short bills. Most have small feet, of little use for walking, and long pointed wings. Their soft plumage is camouflaged to resemble bark or leaves.

 Common nighthawk, Chordeiles minor A
 European nightjar, Caprimulgus europaeus A

Swifts
Order: ApodiformesFamily: Apodidae

Swifts are small birds which spend the majority of their lives flying. These birds have very short legs and never settle voluntarily on the ground, perching instead only on vertical surfaces. Many swifts have long swept-back wings which resemble a crescent or boomerang.

 Alpine swift, Apus melba A
 Common swift, Apus apus 
 Pallid swift, Apus pallidus A

Cuckoos
Order: CuculiformesFamily: Cuculidae

The family Cuculidae includes cuckoos, roadrunners and anis. These birds are of variable size with slender bodies, long tails and strong legs. The Old World cuckoos are brood parasites.

Great spotted cuckoo, Clamator glandarius (A)
Yellow-billed cuckoo, Coccyzus americanus (A)
Black-billed cuckoo, Coccyzus erythropthalmus (A)
Common cuckoo, Cuculus canorus

Sandgrouse
Order: PterocliformesFamily: Pteroclidae

Sandgrouse have small, pigeon like heads and necks, but sturdy compact bodies. They have long pointed wings and sometimes tails and a fast direct flight. Flocks fly to watering holes at dawn and dusk. Their legs are feathered down to the toes.

Pallas's sandgrouse, Syrrhaptes paradoxus (A)

Pigeons and doves
Order: ColumbiformesFamily: Columbidae

Pigeons and doves are stout-bodied birds with short necks and short slender bills with a fleshy cere.

Rock dove, Columba livia
Stock dove, Columba oenas
Common wood pigeon, Columba palumbus
European turtle dove, Streptopelia turtur
Eurasian collared dove, Streptopelia decaocto

Rails, gallinules, and coots
Order: GruiformesFamily: Rallidae

Rallidae is a large family of small to medium-sized birds which includes the rails, crakes, coots and gallinules. Typically they inhabit dense vegetation in damp environments near lakes, swamps or rivers. In general they are shy and secretive birds, making them difficult to observe. Most species have strong legs and long toes which are well adapted to soft uneven surfaces. They tend to have short, rounded wings and to be weak fliers.

Water rail, Rallus aquaticus
Corncrake, Crex crex 
Spotted crake, Porzana porzana
Common moorhen, Gallinula chloropus
Eurasian coot, Fulica atra

Cranes
Order: GruiformesFamily: Gruidae

Cranes are large, long-legged and long-necked birds. Unlike the similar-looking but unrelated herons, cranes fly with necks outstretched, not pulled back. Most have elaborate and noisy courting displays or "dances".

Crane, Grus grus (A)

Grebes

Order: PodicipediformesFamily: Podicipedidae

Grebes are small to medium-large freshwater diving birds. They have lobed toes and are excellent swimmers and divers. However, they have their feet placed far back on the body, making them quite ungainly on land.

 Little grebe, Tachybaptus ruficollis 
 Red-necked grebe, Podiceps grisegena A
 Great crested grebe, Podiceps cristatus 
 Slavonian grebe, Podiceps auritus 
 Black-necked grebe, Podiceps nigricollis A

Stone-curlews
Order: CharadriiformesFamily: Burhinidae

The stone-curlews are a group of largely tropical waders in the family Burhinidae. They are found worldwide within the tropical zone, with some species also breeding in temperate Europe and Australia. They are medium to large waders with strong black or yellow-black bills, large yellow eyes and cryptic plumage. Despite being classed as waders, most species have a preference for arid or semi-arid habitats.

Eurasian stone-curlew, Burhinus oedicnemus A

Oystercatchers
Order: CharadriiformesFamily: Haematopodidae

The oystercatchers are large and noisy plover-like birds, with strong bills used for smashing or prising open molluscs.

Eurasian oystercatcher, Haematopus ostralegus

Stilts and avocets
Order: CharadriiformesFamily: Recurvirostridae

Recurvirostridae is a family of large wading birds, which includes the avocets and stilts. The avocets have long legs and long up-curved bills. The stilts have extremely long legs and long, thin, straight bills.

Black-winged stilt, Himantopus himantopus A
Pied avocet, Recurvirostra avosetta

Plovers and lapwings
Order: CharadriiformesFamily: Charadriidae

The family Charadriidae include the plovers, dotterels and lapwings. They are small to medium-sized birds with compact bodies, short, thick necks and long, usually pointed, wings. They are found in open country worldwide, mostly in habitats near water.

Northern lapwing, Vanellus vanellus
European golden-plover, Pluvialis apricaria
Pacific golden plover, Pluvialis fulva (A)
American golden plover, Pluvialis dominica (A)
Grey plover, Pluvialis squatarola
Common ringed plover, Charadrius hiaticula 
Little ringed plover, Charadrius dubius
Killdeer, Charadrius vociferus (A)
Kentish plover, Charadrius alexandrinus (A)
Eurasian dotterel, Charadrius morinellus

Sandpipers and allies
Order: CharadriiformesFamily: Scolopacidae

Scolopacidae is a large diverse family of small to medium-sized shorebirds including the sandpipers, curlews, godwits, shanks, tattlers, woodcocks, snipes, dowitchers and phalaropes. The majority of these species eat small invertebrates picked out of the mud or soil. Variation in length of legs and bills enables multiple species to feed in the same habitat, particularly on the coast, without direct competition for food.

Upland sandpiper, Bartramia longicauda A
Eurasian whimbrel, Numenius phaeopus
Eurasian curlew, Numenius arquata
Bar-tailed godwit, Limosa lapponica
Black-tailed godwit, Limosa limosa
Ruddy turnstone, Arenaria interpres
Red knot, Calidris canutus
Ruff, Calidris pugnax
Broad-billed sandpiper, Calidris falcinellus A
Stilt sandpiper, Calidris himantopus A
Curlew sandpiper, Calidris ferruginea
Temminck's stint, Calidris temminckii A
Sanderling, Calidris alba
Dunlin, Calidris alpina 
Purple sandpiper, Calidris maritima 
Baird's sandpiper, Calidris bairdii A
Little stint, Calidris minuta 
Least sandpiper, Calidris minutilla A
White-rumped sandpiper, Calidris fuscicollis 
Buff-breasted sandpiper, Calidris subruficollis 
Pectoral sandpiper, Calidris melanotos
Semipalmated sandpiper, Calidris pusilla A
Long-billed dowitcher, Limnodromus scolopaceus A
Short-billed dowitcher, Limnodromus griseus 
Eurasian woodcock, Scolopax rusticola 
Jack snipe, Lymnocryptes minimus 
Great snipe, Gallinago media 
Common snipe, Gallinago gallinago
Wilson's snipe, Gallinago delicata A
Wilson's phalarope, Phalaropus tricolor 
Red-necked phalarope, Phalaropus lobatus
Red phalarope, Phalaropus fulicarius 
Common sandpiper, Actitis hypoleucos 
Spotted sandpiper, Actitis macularius A
Green sandpiper, Tringa ochropus
Lesser yellowlegs, Tringa flavipes A
Common redshank, Tringa totanus
Wood sandpiper, Tringa glareola
Spotted redshank, Tringa erythropus
Common greenshank, Tringa nebularia
Greater yellowlegs, Tringa melanoleuca A

Pratincoles and coursers
Order: CharadriiformesFamily: Glareolidae

Glareolidae is a family of wading birds comprising the pratincoles, which have short legs, long pointed wings, and long forked tails, and the coursers, which have long legs, short wings, and long, pointed bills which curve downwards.

Collared pratincole, Glareola pratincola A
Black-winged pratincole, Glareola nordmanni A

Gulls terns, and skimmers

Order: CharadriiformesFamily: Laridae

Laridae is a family of medium to large seabirds, the gulls, terns, and skimmers. Gulls are typically grey or white, often with black markings on the head or wings. They have stout, longish bills and webbed feet. Terns are a group of generally medium to large seabirds typically with grey or white plumage, often with black markings on the head. Most terns hunt fish by diving but some pick insects off the surface of fresh water. Terns are generally long-lived birds, with several species known to live in excess of 30 years.

 Black-legged kittiwake, Rissa tridactyla 
 Ivory gull, Pagophila eburnea A
 Sabine's gull, Xema sabini
 Bonaparte's gull, Chroicocephalus philadelphia A
 Black-headed gull, Chroicocephalus ridibundus
 Little gull, Hydrocoloeus minutus A
 Ross's gull, Rhodostethia rosea A
 Laughing gull, Leucophaeus atricilla 
 Franklin's gull, Leucophaeus pipixcan A
 Mediterranean gull, Ichthyaetus melanocephalus 
 Common gull, Larus canus 
 Ring-billed gull, Larus delawarensis A
 Great black-backed gull, Larus marinus 
 Glaucous gull, Larus hyperboreus
 Iceland gull, Larus glaucoides 
 European herring gull, Larus argentatus 
 American herring gull, Larus smithsonianus A
 Caspian gull, Larus cachinnans A
 Yellow-legged gull, Larus michahellis A
 Lesser black-backed gull, Larus fuscus 
 Gull-billed tern, Gelochelidon nilotica A
 Lesser crested tern, Thalasseus bengalensis A
 Sandwich tern, Thalasseus sandvicensis
 Elegant tern, Thalasseus elegans A
 Little tern, Sternula albifrons 
 Sooty tern, Onychoprion fuscatus A
 Roseate tern, Sterna dougallii 
 Common tern, Sterna hirundo 
 Arctic tern, Sterna paradisaea
 Forster's tern, Sterna forsteri A
 Whiskered tern, Chlidonias hybrida A
 White-winged tern, Chlidonias niger A
 Black tern, Chlidonias niger

Skuas and jaegers
Order: CharadriiformesFamily: Stercorariidae

The family Stercorariidae are, in general, medium to large birds, typically with grey or brown plumage, often with white markings on the wings. They nest on the ground in temperate and arctic regions and are long-distance migrants.

Great skua, Stercorarius skua
Pomarine jaeger, Stercorarius pomarinus
Parasitic jaeger, Stercorarius parasiticus
Long-tailed jaeger, Stercorarius longicaudus

Auks, murres, and puffins
Order: CharadriiformesFamily: Alcidae

Alcids are superficially similar to penguins due to their black-and-white colours, their upright posture and some of their habits, however they are not related to the penguins and differ in being able to fly. Auks live on the open sea, only deliberately coming ashore to nest.

Little auk, Alle alle
Common murre, Uria aalge
Razorbill, Alca torda
Great auk, Pinguinus impennis A Extinct
Black guillemot, Cepphus grylle
Atlantic puffin, Fratercula arctica

Loons

Order: GaviiformesFamily: Gaviidae

Loons, known as divers in Europe, are a group of aquatic birds found in many parts of North America and northern Europe. They are the size of a large duck or small goose, which they somewhat resemble when swimming, but to which they are completely unrelated.

 Red-throated loon, Gavia stellata 
 Black-throated loon, Gavia arctica 
 Pacific loon, Gavia pacifica A
 Common loon, Gavia immer 
 Yellow-billed loon, Gavia adamsii A

Southern storm-petrels

Order: ProcellariiformesFamily: Oceanitidae

The austral storm petrels are relatives of the petrels and are the smallest seabirds. They feed on planktonic crustaceans and small fish picked from the surface, typically while hovering.

 Wilson's storm petrel, Oceanites oceanicus A

Albatrosses
Order: ProcellariiformesFamily: Diomedeidae

The albatrosses are among the largest of flying birds, and the great albatrosses from the genus Diomedea have the largest wingspans of any extant birds.

Black-browed albatross, Thalassarche melanophris (A)

Northern storm petrels
Order: ProcellariiformesFamily: Hydrobatidae

The northern storm petrels are relatives of the petrels and are the smallest seabirds. They feed on planktonic crustaceans and small fish picked from the surface, typically while hovering. The flight is fluttering and sometimes bat-like.

 European storm petrel, Hydrobates pelagicus 
 Leach's storm petrel, Hydrobates leucorhoa

Petrels and shearwaters
Order: ProcellariiformesFamily: Procellaridae

The procellariids are the main group of medium-sized "true petrels", characterised by united nostrils with medium septum and a long outer functional primary.

 Northern fulmar, Fulmarus glacialis 
 Fea's petrel, Pterodroma feae A
 Scopoli's shearwater, Calonectris diomedea A
 Cory's shearwater, Calonectris borealis 
 Sooty shearwater, Ardenna griseus
 Great shearwater, Ardenna gravis  
 Manx shearwater, Puffinus puffinus 
 Balearic shearwater, Puffinus mauretanicus 
 Barolo shearwater, Puffinus baroli A

Storks
Order: CiconiiformesFamily: Ciconiidae

Storks are large, long-legged, long-necked, wading birds with long, stout bills. Storks are mute, but bill-clattering is an important mode of communication at the nest. Their nests can be large and may be reused for many years. Many species are migratory.

Black stork, Ciconia nigra A
White stork, Ciconia ciconia A

Boobies and gannetsOrder: SuliformesFamily: Sulidae

The sulids comprise the gannets and boobies. Both groups are medium to large coastal seabirds that plunge-dive for fish.

 Northern gannet, Morus bassanus

CormorantsOrder: SuliformesFamily: Phalacrocoracidae

Phalacrocoracidae is a family of medium to large coastal, fish-eating seabirds that includes cormorants and shags. Plumage coloration varies, with the majority having mainly dark plumage, some species being black-and-white, and a few being colorful.

 Great cormorant, Phalacrocorax carbo 
 European shag, Gulosus aristotelis

Ibises and SpoonbillsOrder: PelecaniformesFamily: Threskiornithidae

Threskiornithidae is a family of large terrestrial and wading birds which includes the ibises and spoonbills. They have long, broad wings with 11 primary and about 20 secondary feathers. They are strong fliers and despite their size and weight, very capable soarers.

 African sacred ibis, Plegadis falcinellus I
 Glossy ibis, Plegadis falcinellus A
 Eurasian spoonbill, Platalea leucorodia

Herons and bitternsOrder: PelecaniformesFamily: Ardeidae

The family Ardeidae contains the bitterns, herons and egrets. Herons and egrets are medium to large wading birds with long necks and legs. Bitterns tend to be shorter necked and more wary. Members of Ardeidae fly with their necks retracted, unlike other long-necked birds such as storks, ibises and spoonbills.

 Eurasian bittern, Botaurus stellaris A
 American bittern, Botaurus lentiginosus A
 Little bittern, Ixobrychus minutus A
 Black-crowned night heron, Nycticorax nycticorax A
 Squacco heron, Ardeola ralloides A
 Western cattle egret, Bubulcus ibis A
 Grey heron, Ardea cinerea 
 Purple heron, Ardea purpurea 
 Great egret, Ardea alba A
 Little egret, Egretta garzetta

OspreysOrder: AccipitriformesFamily: Pandionidae

The osprey is a medium-large raptor which is a specialist fish-eater.

Western osprey, Pandion haliaetus

Hawks, eagles, and kitesOrder: AccipitriformesFamily: Accipitridae

Accipitridae is a family of birds of prey, which includes hawks, eagles, kites, harriers and Old World vultures. These birds have powerful hooked beaks for tearing flesh from their prey, strong legs, powerful talons and keen eyesight.

 European honey buzzard, Pernis apivorus A
 Golden eagle, Aquila chrysaetos A
 Eurasian sparrowhawk, Accipiter nisus 
 Northern goshawk, Accipiter gentilis 
 Western marsh harrier, Circus aeruginosus 
 Hen harrier Circus cyaneus 
 Pallid harrier Circus macrourus A
 Montagu's harrier Circus macrourus 
 Red kite, Milvus milvus I
 Black kite, Milvus migrans A
 White-tailed eagle, Haliaaetus albicilla A
 Bald eagle, Haliaaetus leucocephalus A
 Rough-legged buzzard, Buteo lagopus A
 Common buzzard, Buteo buteo

Barn owlsOrder: StrigiformesFamily: Tytonidae

Barn owls are medium to large owls with large heads and characteristic heart-shaped faces. They have long strong legs with powerful talons.

Western barn owl, Tyto alba

OwlsOrder: StrigiformesFamily: Strigidae

The typical owls are small to large solitary nocturnal birds of prey. They have large forward-facing eyes and ears, a hawk-like beak and a conspicuous circle of feathers around each eye called a facial disk.

 Little owl, Athene noctua A
 Eurasian scops owl, Otus scops A
 Long-eared owl, Asio otus 
 Short-eared owl, Asio flammeus 
 Snowy owl, Bubo scandiaca A

HoopoesOrder: BucerotiformesFamily: Upupidae

Hoopoes have black, white and orangey-pink colouring with a large erectile crest on their head. 

Eurasian hoopoe, Upupa epops

RollersOrder: CoraciiformesFamily: Coraciidae

Rollers resemble crows in size and build, but are more closely related to the kingfishers and bee-eaters. They share the colourful appearance of those groups with blues and browns predominating. The two inner front toes are connected, but the outer toe is not.

European roller, Coracias garrulus A

KingfishersOrder: CoraciiformesFamily: Alcedinidae

Kingfishers are medium-sized birds with large heads, long, pointed bills, short legs and stubby tails.

Common kingfisher, Alcedo atthis
Belted kingfisher, Megaceryle alcyon A

Bee-eatersOrder: CoraciiformesFamily: Meropidae

The bee-eaters are a group of near passerine birds in the family Meropidae. Most species are found in Africa but others occur in southern Europe, Madagascar, Australia and New Guinea. They are characterised by richly coloured plumage, slender bodies and usually elongated central tail feathers. All are colourful and have long downturned bills and pointed wings, which give them a swallow-like appearance when seen from afar.

European bee-eater, Merops apiaster

WoodpeckersOrder: PiciformesFamily: Picidae

Woodpeckers are small to medium-sized birds with chisel-like beaks, short legs, stiff tails and long tongues used for capturing insects. Some species have feet with two toes pointing forward and two backward, while several species have only three toes. Many woodpeckers have the habit of tapping noisily on tree trunks with their beaks.

Eurasian wryneck, Jynx torquilla
Lesser spotted woodpecker, Dryobates minor
Great spotted woodpecker, Dendrocopos major
European green woodpecker, Picus viridis A

Falcons and caracarasOrder: FalconiformesFamily: Falconidae

Falconidae is a family of diurnal birds of prey. They differ from hawks, eagles and kites in that they kill with their beaks instead of their talons.

 Common kestrel, Falco tinnunculus 
 Red-footed falcon, Falco vespertinus A
 Merlin, Falco columbarius 
 Eurasian hobby, Falco subbuteo A
 Gyrfalcon, Falco rusticolus A
 Peregrine falcon, Falco peregrinus

Old World parrotsOrder: PsittaciformesFamily: Psittaculidae

Characteristic features of parrots include a strong curved bill, an upright stance, strong legs, and clawed zygodactyl feet. Many parrots are vividly colored, and some are multi-colored. Old World parrots are found from Africa east across south and southeast Asia and Oceania to Australia and New Zealand.

 Rose-ringed parakeet, Psittacula krameri (I)

ShrikesOrder: PasseriformesFamily: Laniidae

Shrikes are passerine birds known for their habit of catching other birds and small animals and impaling the uneaten portions of their bodies on thorns. A typical shrike's beak is hooked, like a bird of prey.

Red-backed shrike, Lanius collurio (A)
Isabelline shrike, Lanius isabellinus (A)
Red-tailed shrike, Lanius phoenicuroides (A)
Great grey shrike, Lanius excubitor (A)
Woodchat shrike, Lanius senator (A)

Vireos, shrike-babblers, and erpornisOrder: PasseriformesFamily: Vireonidae

The vireos are a group of small to medium-sized passerine birds. They are typically greenish in color and resemble wood warblers apart from their heavier bills.

Red-eyed vireo, Vireo olivaceus (A)

Old World oriolesOrder: PasseriformesFamily: Oriolidae

The Old World orioles are colourful passerine birds. They are not related to the New World orioles.

Eurasian golden oriole, Oriolus oriolus (A)

Crows, jays, and magpiesOrder: PasseriformesFamily: Corvidae

The family Corvidae includes crows, ravens, jays, choughs, magpies, treepies, nutcrackers and ground jays. Corvids are above average in size among the Passeriformes, and some of the larger species show high levels of intelligence.

Eurasian jay, Garrulus glandarius
Eurasian magpie, Pica pica
Red-billed chough, Corvus monedula
Western jackdaw, Corvus monedula
House crow, Corvus splendens (A)
Rook, Corvus frugilegus
Carrion crow, Corvus corone
Hooded crow, Corvus cornix
Northern raven, Corvus corax

WaxwingsOrder: PasseriformesFamily: Bombycillidae

The waxwings are a group of birds with soft silky plumage and unique red tips to some of the wing feathers. In the Bohemian and cedar waxwings, these tips look like sealing wax and give the group its name. These are arboreal birds of northern forests. They live on insects in summer and berries in winter.

Bohemian waxwing, Bombycilla garrulus

Tits, chickadees, and titmiceOrder: PasseriformesFamily''': Paridae

The Paridae are mainly small stocky woodland species with short stout bills. Some have crests. They are adaptable birds, with a mixed diet including seeds and insects.

Coal tit, Periparus aterEurasian blue tit, Cyanistes caeruleus
Great tit, Parus major

Bearded reedlingOrder: PasseriformesFamily: Panuridae

This species, the only one in its family, is found in reed beds throughout temperate Europe and Asia.

 Bearded reedling, Panurus biarmicus

LarksOrder: PasseriformesFamily: Alaudidae

Larks are small terrestrial birds with often extravagant songs and display flights. Most larks are fairly dull in appearance. Their food is insects and seeds.

Woodlark, Lullula arborea (A)
Eurasian skylark, Alauda arvensis
Horned lark, Eremophila alpestris (A)
Greater short-toed lark, Calandrella brachydactyla (A)

SwallowsOrder: PasseriformesFamily: Hirundinidae

The family Hirundinidae is adapted to aerial feeding. They have a slender streamlined body, long pointed wings and a short bill with a wide gape. The feet are adapted to perching rather than walking, and the front toes are partially joined at the base.

Sand martin, Riparia riparia
Barn swallow, Hirundo rustica
Common house-martin, Delichon urbicum
Red-rumped swallow, Cecropis daurica (A)

Long-tailed titsOrder: PasseriformesFamily: Aegithalidae

Long-tailed tits are a group of small passerine birds with medium to long tails. They make woven bag nests in trees. Most eat a mixed diet which includes insects.

Long-tailed tit, Aegithalos caudatus

Leaf warblersOrder: PasseriformesFamily: Phylloscopidae

Leaf warblers are a family of small insectivorous birds found mostly in Eurasia and ranging into Wallacea and Africa. The species are of various sizes, often green-plumaged above and yellow below, or more subdued with grayish-green to grayish-brown colors.

Wood warbler, Phylloscopus sibilatrix
Yellow-browed warbler, Phylloscopus inornatus (A)
Pallas's leaf warbler, Phylloscopus proregulus (A)
Radde's warbler, Phylloscopus schwarzi (A)
Willow warbler, Phylloscopus trochilus
Common chiffchaff, Phylloscopus collybita

Reed warblers and alliesOrder: PasseriformesFamily: Acrocephalidae

The members of this family are usually rather large for "warblers". Most are rather plain olivaceous brown above with much yellow to beige below. They are usually found in open woodland, reedbeds, or tall grass. The family occurs mostly in southern to western Eurasia and surroundings, but it also ranges far into the Pacific, with some species in Africa.

Sedge warbler, Acrocephalus schoenobaenus
Eurasian reed warbler, Acrocephalus scirpaceus
Melodious warbler, Hippolais polyglotta (A)
Icterine warbler, Hippolais icterina (A)

Grassbirds and allies Order: PasseriformesFamily: Locustellidae

Locustellidae are a family of small insectivorous songbirds found mainly in Eurasia, Africa, and the Australian region. They are smallish birds with tails that are usually long and pointed, and tend to be drab brownish or buffy all over.

Common grasshopper warbler, Locustella naevia

Sylviid warblers and alliesOrder: PasseriformesFamily: Sylviidae

The family Sylviidae is a group of small insectivorous passerine birds. They mainly occur as breeding species, as the common name implies, in Europe, Asia and, to a lesser extent, Africa. Most are of generally undistinguished appearance, but many have distinctive songs.

Eurasian blackcap, Sylvia atricapilla
Garden warbler, Sylvia borin
Barred warbler, Curruca nisoria (A)
Lesser whitethroat, Curruca curruca (A)
Eastern subalpine warbler, Curruca cantillans (A)
Common whitethroat, Curruca communis

KingletsOrder: PasseriformesFamily: Regulidae

The kinglets, also called crests, are a small group of birds often included in the Old World warblers, but frequently given family status because they also resemble the titmice.

Firecrest, Regulus ignicapillus
Goldcrest, Regulus regulus

WrensOrder: PasseriformesFamily: Troglodytidae

The wrens are mainly small and inconspicuous except for their loud songs. These birds have short wings and thin down-turned bills. Several species often hold their tails upright. All are insectivorous.

Eurasian wren, Troglodytes troglodytes

NuthatchesOrder: PasseriformesFamily: Sittidae

Nuthatches are small woodland birds. They have the unusual ability to climb down trees head first, unlike other birds which can only go upwards. Nuthatches have big heads, short tails and powerful bills and feet.

Eurasian nuthatch, Sitta europaea (A)

TreecreepersOrder: PasseriformesFamily: Certhiidae

Treecreepers are small woodland birds, brown above and white below. They have thin pointed down-curved bills, which they use to extricate insects from bark. They have stiff tail feathers, like woodpeckers, which they use to support themselves on vertical trees.

Eurasian treecreeper, Certhia familiaris

StarlingsOrder: PasseriformesFamily: Sturnidae

Starlings are small to medium-sized Old World passerine birds with strong feet. Their flight is strong and direct and most are very gregarious. Their preferred habitat is fairly open country, and they eat insects and fruit. The plumage of several species is dark with a metallic sheen.

Rosy starling, Pastor roseus (A)
Common starling, Sturnus vulgaris

Thrushes and alliesOrder: PasseriformesFamily: Turdidae

The thrushes are a group of passerine birds that occur mainly in the Old World. They are plump, soft plumaged, small to medium-sized insectivores or sometimes omnivores, often feeding on the ground. Many have attractive songs.

White's thrush, Zoothera aurea (A)
Song thrush, Turdus philomelos
Mistle thrush, Turdus viscivorus
Redwing, Turdus iliacus
Common blackbird, Turdus merula
Fieldfare, Turdus pilaris
Ring ouzel, Turdus torquatus (A)
American robin, Turdus migratorius (A)

Old World flycatchersOrder: PasseriformesFamily: Muscicapidae

Old World flycatchers are a large group of small passerine birds native to the Old World. They are mainly small arboreal insectivores. The appearance of these birds is highly varied, but they mostly have weak songs and harsh calls.

Spotted flycatcher, Muscicapa striata
Asian brown flycatcher, Muscicapa dauurica (A)
European robin, Erithacus rubecula
Bluethroat, Luscinia svecica (A)
Common nightingale, Luscinia megarhynchos (A)
Red-flanked bluetail, Tarsiger cyanurus (A)
Red-breasted flycatcher, Ficedula parva
European pied flycatcher, Ficedula hypoleuca
Black redstart, Phoenicurus ochruros
Common redstart, Phoenicurus phoenicurus
Whinchat, Saxicola rubetra
European stonechat, Saxicola rubicola 
Northern wheatear, Oenanthe oenanthe

DippersOrder: PasseriformesFamily: Cinclidae

Dippers are a group of perching birds whose habitat includes aquatic environments in the Americas, Europe and Asia. They are named for their bobbing or dipping movements.

White-throated dipper, Cinclus cinclus

Old World sparrowsOrder: PasseriformesFamily: Passeridae

Old World sparrows are small passerine birds. In general, sparrows tend to be small, plump, brown or grey birds with short tails and short powerful beaks. Sparrows are seed eaters, but they also consume small insects.

Eurasian tree sparrow, Passer montanus
House sparrow, Passer domesticus

AccentorsOrder: PasseriformesFamily: Prunellidae

The accentors are in the only bird family, Prunellidae, which is completely endemic to the Palearctic. They are small, fairly drab species superficially similar to sparrows.

Dunnock, Prunella modularis

Wagtails and pipitsOrder: PasseriformesFamily: Motacillidae

Motacillidae is a family of small passerine birds with medium to long tails. They include the wagtails, longclaws and pipits. They are slender, ground feeding insectivores of open country.

Western yellow wagtail, Motacilla flava 
Citrine wagtail, Motacilla citreola (A)
Grey wagtail, Motacilla cinerea 
White wagtail, Motacilla alba
Richard's pipit, Anthus richardi (A)
Tawny pipit, Anthus campestris (A)
Meadow pipit, Anthus pratensis
Tree pipit, Anthus trivialis (A)
Red-throated pipit, Anthus cervinus (A)
Buff-bellied pipit, Anthus rubescens (A)
Water pipit, Anthus spinoletta (A)
European rock pipit, Anthus petrosus

Finches, euphonias, and alliesOrder: PasseriformesFamily: Fringillidae

Finches are seed-eating passerine birds, that are small to moderately large and have a strong beak, usually conical and in some species very large. All have twelve tail feathers and nine primaries. These birds have a bouncing flight with alternating bouts of flapping and gliding on closed wings, and most sing well.

Common chaffinch, Fringilla coelebs
Brambling, Fringilla montifringilla 
Hawfinch, Coccothraustes coccothraustes (A)
Eurasian bullfinch, Pyrrhula pyrrhula
Common rosefinch, Carpodacus erythrinus (A)
European greenfinch, Chloris chloris
Twite, Linaria flavirostris 
Common linnet, Linaria cannabina
Common redpoll, Acanthis flammea
Lesser redpoll, Acanthis cabaret
Crossbill, Loxia curvirostra
Two-barred crossbill, Loxia leucoptera (A)
European goldfinch, Carduelis carduelis
Eurasian siskin, Spinus spinus

Longspurs and arctic buntingsOrder: PasseriformesFamily: Calcariidae

The Calcariidae are a family of birds that had been traditionally grouped with the New World sparrows, but differ in a number of respects and are usually found in open grassy areas.

Lapland longspur, Calcarius lapponicus
Snow bunting, Plectrophenax nivalis

Old World buntingsOrder: PasseriformesFamily: Emberizidae

The emberizids are a large family of passerine birds. They are seed-eating birds with distinctively shaped bills. Many emberizid species have distinctive head patterns.

Corn bunting, Emberiza calandra 
Yellowhammer, Emberiza citrinella
Little bunting, Emberiza pusilla  (A)
Rustic bunting, Emberiza rustica (A)
Black-headed bunting, Emberiza melanocephala (A)
Common reed bunting, Emberiza schoeniclus

New World sparrowsOrder: PasseriformesFamily: Passerellidae

Until 2017, these species were considered part of the family Emberizidae. Most of the species are known as sparrows, but these birds are not closely related to the Old World sparrows which are in the family Passeridae. Many of these have distinctive head patterns.

Red fox sparrow, Passerella iliaca (A)
Dark-eyed junco, Junco hyemalis (A)
White-throated sparrow, Zonotrichia albicollis (A)

New World warblersOrder: PasseriformesFamily: Parulidae

The wood-warblers are a group of small often colorful passerine birds restricted to the New World. Most are arboreal, but some are more terrestrial. Most members of this family are insectivores.

Black-and-white warbler, Mniotilta varia (A)
Common yellowthroat, Geothlypis trichas (A)

Cardinals and alliesOrder: PasseriformesFamily': Cardinalidae

The cardinals are a family of robust, seed-eating birds with strong bills. They are typically associated with open woodland. The sexes usually have distinct plumages.

Scarlet tanager, Piranga olivacea'' (A)

See also
List of birds
Lists of birds by region

References

Northern Ireland-related lists
Northern Ireland